James Barber (23 March 1923 – 29 November 2007) was an English-born Canadian cookbook author and host of The Urban Peasant, a CBC cooking show.

Barber worked as an engineer before becoming a food critic for The Province. He immigrated to Canada in 1952. His lifelong interest in food and writing and his increased knowledge in these areas naturally led him to become a cookbook author. Following his retirement, he spent his remaining years on his farm in British Columbia's Cowichan Valley on Vancouver Island. An energetic and passionate man with a large personality, Barber strove to empower others to do things for themselves.

Barber was married twice and fathered five children; 3 sons and 2 daughters. Perhaps fittingly, Barber died peacefully on 29 November 2007, at his farm of natural causes while sitting at the dining room table reading a cookbook with a pot of chicken soup simmering on the stove. He was 84 years old and is survived by his wife and five children.

TV appearances
The Fry Pan Man, host
The Dini Petty Show, frequent appearances
The Urban Peasant, host

Newspapers and magazines
National Post, occasionally
Pacific Yachting
Vancouver Magazine
The Vancouver Sun

Books
Ginger Tea Makes Friends (Illustrated) (1971 McClelland and Stewart )
Fear of Frying (1978 Douglas & McIntyre )
Ginger Tea Makes Friends (1982 Madrona Publishing )
Flash in the Pan (1982 Douglas & McIntyre Ltd )
James Barber Mushrooms Are Marvellous (1984 Douglas & McIntyre Ltd.; First edition )
James Barber's Personal Guide to the Best Eating in Vancouver (1985 North Country Book Express )
James Barber's Immodest but Honest Good Eating Cookbook (1986 Solstice Press )
Urban Peasant (1991 Raincoast Book Dist Ltd )
Urban Peasant Quick & Simple Cookbook (1993 Urban Peasant Productions )
The Urban Peasant: Recipes from the Popular Television Cooking Series (1994 Hasting House Publishing )
Peasant's Choice (1994 Urban Peasant Productions )
Peasant's Choice: More of the Best from the Urban Peasant Recipes from the Popular Television Cooking Series (1995 Hasting House Publishing )
Peasant's Alphabet: More of the best from the Urban Peasant (1997 Urban Peasant Productions )
Cooking for Two: The Urban Peasant (1999 Macmillan Press )
Ginger Tea Makes Friends (2000 Raincoast Book Dist Ltd )
Flash in the Pan (2000 Raincoast Book Dist Ltd )
Fear of Frying (2000 Raincoast Book Dist Ltd )
Chef's Salad: Greens, Vegetables, Pasta, Bean, Seafood, Potato (2003 ) James Barber (foreword)
One-Pot Wonders: James Barber Recipes for Land and Sea (2006 Harbor )

References

External links

Official Twitter Page
Official Facebook Page

1923 births
2007 deaths
Canadian television chefs
British emigrants to Canada
Writers from Vancouver
Canadian food writers
Canadian male non-fiction writers
Canadian cookbook writers
People from Dover, Kent
British cookbook writers